= Château La Serre =

Coordinates: 44.8931°N 0.1507°W

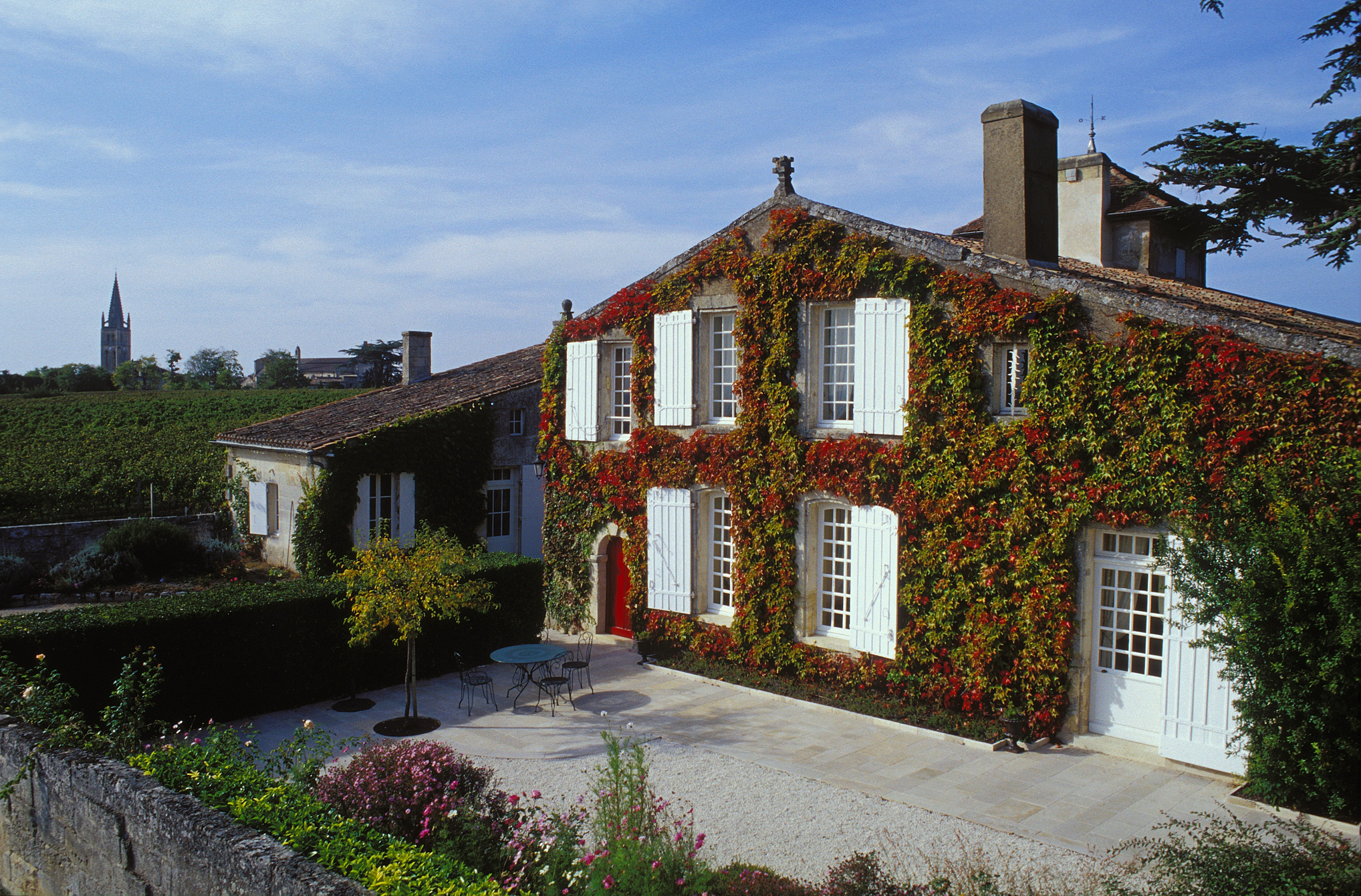

Château La Serre is a château and vineyard in Gironde, Nouvelle-Aquitaine, France.
